106 Aquarii, abbreviated 106 Aqr, is a single star in the equatorial constellation of Aquarius. 106 Aquarii is the Flamsteed designation, and it also bears the Bayer designation i1 Aquarii. It has an apparent visual magnitude of +5.2, making it bright enough to be viewed from the suburbs according to the Bortle Dark-Sky Scale.

The spectrum of this star fits a stellar classification of B9 V, indicating this is a B-type main sequence star. It is spinning rapidly with a projected rotational velocity of 328 km/s. The star has 3 times the mass of the Sun and is radiating 152 times the Sun's luminosity from its photosphere at an effective temperature of 11,555 K. X-ray emission with a luminosity of  has been detected from this star. This is unusual since a B-type star normally does not have any significant X-ray emission. Instead, it may have an undetected lower mass companion.

References

External links
Aladin previewer, image
Aladin sky atlas, image

Aquarius (constellation)
Aquarii, i1
Aquarii, 106
B-type main-sequence stars
117089
222847
8998
BD-19 6500